The Rose Bush of Memories is a 1914 American silent short film. The film starred Earle Foxe, Miriam Cooper, Courtenay Foote, and Charles Courtwright.

External links

American silent short films
1914 films
American black-and-white films
1910s American films